Rhaune Laslett (15 November 1919 – 28 April 2002) was a community activist and the principal organiser of the Notting Hill Fayre or Festival, that evolved into the Notting Hill Carnival.

Biography

Rhaune Laslett was born Freda Pulverness in Stepney in the East End of London. Her mother Jennie was the daughter of Harris and Betsy Noskovitch. Her father was Abraham Pulverness. Laslett often claimed that she was of Native American heritage.

With the name Frederica R.A.J. Pulvernes or Gibbons, she married Terence A. Laslett in 1947 and was later divorced. In 1960 she was a matron of the Pixie Hollow home in Grove Road, Ramsgate, Kent. At the trial, she was acquitted of the main charges but, because of her record, she was sentenced to nine months in prison.

Laslett became president of the London Free School, organised by a coalition of local activists, including some emerging underground artists of the area, particularly John "Hoppy" Hopkins. The aims of the school were "to promote cooperation and understanding between people of various races and creeds through education and through working together". John Michell and Michael X provided 26 Powis Terrace as a base and the idea was born of a free festival, which became the Notting Hill Carnival.

She set up the Children's Play Group at 34 Tavistock Crescent that was visited on 15 May 1966 by Muhammad Ali prior to his fight against Henry Cooper.

She became president of the London Free School, organised by a coalition of local activists, including some emerging underground artists of the area, particularly John "Hoppy" Hopkins. The aims of the school were "to promote cooperation and understanding between people of various races and creeds through education and through working together". John Michell and Michael X provided 26 Powis Terrace as a base and the idea was born of a free fayre or festival, which became the Notting Hill Carnival.

In 1968 she married James O'Brien in London.

Notting Hill Carnival

In a series of articles to newspaper correspondents and in The Grove (newsletter of the London Free School), Laslett outlined the aims of the festival – that the various culture groups of Notting Hill become more familiar with each other's customs, to bring more colour and life to the streets and to counter the perception of the area being a run-down slum. As she stated to The Grove, "We felt that although West Indians, Africans, Irish and many other nationalities all live in a very congested area, there is very little communication between us. If we can infect them with a desire to participate then this can only have good results." The "Notting Hill Fayre and Pageant", or the London Free School Fair, was held over a week starting on the 18th September 1966, and, as well as featuring a pageant that included "a man dressed as Elizabeth I and children as Charles Dickens characters", there was "a Portobello parade consisting of the London Irish girl pipers, a West Indian New Orleans-style marching band, Ginger Johnson's African-Cuban band, and Russell Henderson's Trinidadian steelband from the Coleherne pub in Earl's Court, followed by 2 fire engines".

As Gary Younge has written, Laslett "spoke to the local police about organising a carnival". With more of an English fete in mind, she invited the various ethnic groups of what was then the poor area of Notting Hill - Ukrainians, Spanish, Portuguese, Irish, Caribbeans and Africans - to contribute to a week-long event that would culminate with an August bank holiday parade....She borrowed costumes from Madame Tussaud's; a local hairdresser did the hair and make-up for nothing; the gas board and fire brigade had floats; and stallholders in Portobello market donated horses and carts. Around 1,500 people turned up, according to police figures."

Neighbourhood Service
Out of the new-found energy in and around the Free School, and George Clark's work to establish the Community Workshop, Laslett established the Notting Hill Neighbourhood Service, one of the first voluntary services to offer free legal and drugs advice as well as an all-round welfare service. The work of the service is featured in a chapter of the book Drop Out by Robin Farquharson.

Legacy
"Laslett's Carnival: A Photography Exhibition", a photographic journey into the history of Notting Hill Carnival and its early pioneers, was held at The Tabernacle, Notting Hill, in August 2011.

On 26 August 2011, a blue plaque commemorating Laslett's conception of the Notting Hill street festival that "later evolved into Notting Hill Carnival" was unveiled on the corner of Tavistock Square and Portobello Road (organised by the Nubian Jak Community Trust), facing another blue plaque that commemorates Claudia Jones, who in 1959 organised an indoor Caribbean carnival event.

On the eve of the 2016 Carnival, in a series of articles, the leading black newspaper The Voice recognised that "Yes, this is Notting Hill Carnival's 50th year" and "Rhaune Laslett: The true founder of Notting Hill Carnival".

Notes

Further reading
 Abner Cohen (1993), Masquerade Politics: explorations in the structure of urban cultural movements. Chapter 1: A Resurrected London Fair.
 "Rhaune Laslett, The Notting Hill Festival", in Carnival: A Photographic and Testimonial History of the Notting Hill Carnival, London: Rice N Peas, pp. 50–83. .

External links
Rhaune Laslett – page dedicated to the recognition of her role as founder of Notting Hill Carnival
Gary Younge, "The politics of partying", The Guardian, 17 August 2001.
Bill Tuckey, "In the beginning...", The Independent, 22 August 2002.
Notting Hill in 1966
 - video interview with Peter Joseph.
 Margaret Busby, "The Notting Hill carnival has an unsung hero – Rhaune Laslett", The Guardian, 24 August 2014.

English activists
English women activists
English people of Russian descent
1919 births
2002 deaths
British Jews